Elachista listrionea is a moth of the family Elachistidae. It is found in the Australian state of New South Wales.

The wingspan is about 7 mm for males. The forewings are pale ochreous and the hindwings are pale grey.

References

Moths described in 2011
listrionea
Moths of Australia